Gary Richard Perry Dicker (born 31 July 1986) is an Irish football coach and former professional player.

He started his career with League of Ireland club UCD and went on to make more than 200 appearances in the English Football League, most notably with Brighton & Hove Albion, then spending almost five-and-a-half-years with Scottish Premiership side Kilmarnock before semi-retiring in 2021 when he returned to Brighton and became a player-coach for Brighton & Hove Albion U23s. Dicker played for his country of Ireland at under-19 and under-21 level. After retiring as a player, he joined the coaching staff at Brighton, and since September 2022 has been assistant head coach of the club's U21 team.

Club career

UCD
Born in Dublin, Dicker began his career at League of Ireland side UCD. He joined from his local junior club Cherry Orchard and was gradually introduced into the first team through substitute appearances towards the latter end of UCD's successful 2004 First Division campaign. Dicker progressed his way into a regular starting position the following season and successfully partnered Tony McDonnell in central midfield for the 2005 and 2006 Premier Division seasons. During his time at UCD he earned underage honours for Ireland at under-19 and under-21 level.

In the 2006 League of Ireland close season he spent a loan spell at Championship side Birmingham City, but he never made it past the reserve team. He made his debut for the Birmingham City reserves against Stoke City Reserves, which Birmingham won 3–0. The Birmingham reserve team coach, Keith Bertschin, described Dicker as a "very decent player. He's a good technical player, who can see and put in some lovely weighted passes and is decent with both feet".

Stockport County
Dicker was signed by manager Jim Gannon for Stockport County on 29 May 2007, for a fee of just £40,000, signing a contract until 1 July 2010. He played a regular part in Stockport's 2007–08 League Two campaign and took part in a promotion for the second time in his career as County successfully negotiated their way into League One via the playoffs. Dicker was a fan favourite during his time at Stockport for his passing ability and off the ball work rate. Dicker scored his only goal for Stockport in November 2008, opening the scoring in a 5–0 win in an FA Cup first-round tie at home to Yeovil Town.

Brighton & Hove Albion

On 26 March 2009, Dicker joined League One side Brighton & Hove Albion on loan for the remainder of the season. He made nine appearances for the Seagulls, scoring one goal, during this spell. On 25 June, he joined Brighton on a free transfer, signing a two-year contract. On 28 April 2011, having helped Brighton secure promotion to the Championship, Dicker was rewarded with a two-year contract extension. He was released when that contract expired at the end of the 2012–13 season.

Rochdale
On 13 September 2013, Dicker joined Rochdale on an initial five-month deal.

Crawley Town (loan)
On 23 January 2014, Dicker joined Crawley Town for the remainder of the 2013–14 season.

Carlisle United
On 27 June 2014, Dicker signed a two-year deal with League Two side Carlisle United.

Kilmarnock
On 1 February 2016, Dicker moved to Scottish Premiership club Kilmarnock, signing an eighteen-month contract. He made his debut in a Scottish Cup tie away to Rangers five days later. In early February 2021, Dicker was asked to help take temporary charge of the Kilmarnock first team alongside James Fowler and Andy Millen following the departure of Alex Dyer. He left Kilmarnock at the end of the 2020–21 season.

Return to Brighton
Dicker returned to Brighton & Hove Albion on 2 July 2021, signing a deal to become a coach for the U23s whilst being eligible to play as one of three over-age outfield players in the Premier League 2. He made his first appearance since signing on 14 September, starting in the away trip at Walsall in the group stage of the EFL Trophy. He was shown a straight red card for a dangerous challenge on Emmanuel Osadebe in the 1–0 loss. On 25 January 2022, Dicker announced his retirement from playing professional football.

Coaching career

On 31 January 2022, six days after he announced his retirement from playing, Dicker became a coach for Brighton & Hove Albion U18s, working alongside James Baxter. In September 2022, he became assistant to Albion U21s head coach Shannon Ruth.

Career statistics

Note

• Statistic table is currently missing the stats for Dicker's UCD career and his Birmingham City loan spell.

Honours
Stockport County
Football League Two play-offs: 2008

Brighton & Hove Albion
Football League One: 2010–11

References

External links

1986 births
Living people
Association footballers from Dublin (city)
Republic of Ireland association footballers
Republic of Ireland under-21 international footballers
Association football midfielders
University College Dublin A.F.C. players
Birmingham City F.C. players
Stockport County F.C. players
Brighton & Hove Albion F.C. players
Rochdale A.F.C. players
Crawley Town F.C. players
Carlisle United F.C. players
Kilmarnock F.C. players
League of Ireland players
English Football League players
Scottish Professional Football League players
Association football coaches
Brighton & Hove Albion F.C. non-playing staff